Malatrogia is a monotypic moth genus of the family Erebidae. Its only species, Malatrogia castanitis, is found in Meghalaya, India. The genus was described by George Hampson in 1926, while the species had been described by the same author in 1902.

References

Calpinae
Monotypic moth genera